Shaab may refer to:
Shaab, Armenia, a town in the Kotayk Province of Armenia
Sha'ab, Baghdad, a neighborhood of Baghdad, Iraq
Al-Shaab Stadium, a stadium in Baghdad, Iraq
Sha'ab, Israel, an Arab town and local council in the Northern District of Israel
Al-Shaab CSC, a multi-sports club based in Sharjah, UAE
Al-Sha'ab Hadramaut, a football team based in Hadramaut, Yemen
Al-Shaab Ibb, a football club based in Ibb, Yemen